Katrina Wan Ka Kai (born 8 March 1988) is a snooker player from Hong Kong. She was runner-up in the 2018 Australian Women's Open.

Biography

Wan started playing on the women's snooker circuit in 2013. She reached her highest ranking to date, 5th, in October 2018.

At the 2016 WLBS World Ladies Pairs Championship, Wan and Ng On-yee, beat Maria Catalano and Tatjana Vasiljeva 4–1.

Another doubles success for Wan was partnering Sanderson Lam to win the Festival of Women's Snooker 10-Red mixed pairs’ tournament in 2017.

Wan was runner-up at the 2018 Australian Women's Open. She topped her qualifying group by winning all five matches 3–0, then saw off Janine Rollings 3–0 in the last 16, and Jessica Woods 3–1 in the quarter final. In the semi-final, Wan beat 11-times world champion Reanne Evans 4–3. Wan won the first  of the final against Ng On-yee, then lost the next three, before winning another to trail 2–3. On-yee then won the sixth frame to take the match 4–2.

She began the 2019–20 season ranked eighth.

Titles and achievements
2015 UK Ladies Championship semi-finalist
2016 World Ladies Pairs Championship winner (with Ng On-yee)
2016 World Women's Snooker Championship quarter-finalist 
2017 World Women's Snooker Championship quarter-finalist 
2018 Women's World Snooker Championship semi-finalist
2017 10-Red Mixed Pairs’ Champion, with Sanderson Lam, Festival of Women's Snooker
2018 European Women's Masters (Challenge Cup) winner
2018 Australian Women's Open runner-up

References

External links
Report on a 2017 Snooker clinic held by Stephen Hendry for Wan and other Hong Kong players
Team singles Katrina v Vidya 2014 Katrina Wan plays Vidya Pillai at the 2014 IBSF World Ladies Team Championship

Female snooker players
Hong Kong snooker players
1988 births
Living people